The 1892 United States presidential election in Kansas took place on November 8, 1892. All contemporary 44 states were part of the 1892 United States presidential election. Kansas voters chose ten electors to the Electoral College, which selected the president and vice president.

Kansas was won by the Populist nominees, James B. Weaver of Iowa and his running mate James G. Field of Virginia. Weaver and Field defeated the Republican nominees, incumbent President Benjamin Harrison of Indiana and his running mate Whitelaw Reid of New York. This was the first time that a non-Republican had won Kansas’ electoral votes since statehood, and one of only seven times out of thirty-nine that Kansas has not voted Republican in a Presidential Election.

Kansas was one of a handful of states, five in total, that did not feature former and future President Grover Cleveland on their ballots: Kansas had been his second weakest state in 1888, garnering only 31.03 percent of the vote. Kansas was also Weaver's fourth strongest state percentage-wise and the state which gave him the most popular votes. Lorenzo D. Lewelling, a fellow Populist, was elected Governor of Kansas, almost perfectly matching Weaver's vote total.

Results

Results by county

See also
 Grover Cleveland's first term as President of the United States
 United States presidential elections in Kansas

Notes

References
The American Presidency Project

Kansas
1892
1892 Kansas elections